NEP or Nep may refer to:

Organizations
 NEP Group, Inc., a US-based television production company
 NHK Enterprises, a commercial subsidiary of Japanese public broadcaster NHK
 National Election Pool, a consortium of US news organizations
 Network equipment provider

Economics
 National Energy Program, in Canada
 New Economic Policy, Soviet Union 1921-1928
 Malaysian New Economic Policy

Other uses
 N-Ethylpentedrone, a stimulant drug
 N.E.P., a rock band from St. Petersburg, Russia, est. 1988
 Nepal, FIFA and IOC code NEP
 Nepr, a Norse god
 Neprilysin or neutral endopeptidase
 Needle exchange programme
 New Economic Party, an Israeli political party
 Noise-equivalent power of a photodetector
 Northeast Passage, polar waterway